40 is the ninth studio album by American rockabilly band Stray Cats, released in May 2019 by Surfdog Records. It is their first studio album in 26 years since Original Cool in 1993. The album was recorded, mixed, and mastered in Nashville, TN.

Critical reception 

Joe Bosso of Guitar Player said: "The album brims with bracing, stripped-down rockers like 'Cat Fight (Over a Dog Like Me),' 'Mean Pickin' Mama' and 'Devil Train,' and every track boasts a widescreen riff and virtuoso guitar solo. But the band also serves up some new sounds with the riff rocker 'Cry Danger' (co-written with Mike Campbell) and the punk-like 'I'll Be Looking Out for You.'"

Kenneth Partridge of Billboard said: "Four decades later, Stray Cats are ready to 'Rock It Off' with the same three basic ingredients they've always used: Setzer's twangy Gretsch guitar, drummer Slim Jim Phantom's elemental thumping and Lee Rocker's expertly slapped upright bass…On the standout 'Cry Danger,' the Cats venture out of their '50s comfort zone and move boldly into '60s garage-rock territory. The track features an intro guitar riff that'll make any Beatles fan instantly think of 'Day Tripper.'"

Track listing 
Adapted from MSOPR.

 "Cat Fight (Over a Dog Like Me)" (Brian Setzer, Mike Himelstein) – 2:14
 "Rock It Off" (Setzer, Himelstein) – 2:59
 "I've Got Love If You Want It" – 3:04
 "Cry Danger" (Setzer, Himelstein, Mike Campbell) – 3:09
 "I Attract Trouble" (Setzer, Himelstein) – 3:42
 "Three Time's a Charm" (Setzer, Himelstein) – 2:07
 "That's Messed Up" (Setzer, Himelstein) – 3:56
 "When Nothing's Going Right" (Lee Rocker as Leon Drucker) – 3:01
 "Desperado" (Setzer) – 2:55
 "Mean Pickin' Mama" (Setzer) – 2:40
 "I'll Be Looking Out for You" (Setzer) – 2:35
 "Devil Train" (Setzer) – 3:17
 "Too Hip Gotta Go" (Japanese version bonus track.)

Personnel 
Stray Cats
 Brian Setzer – guitars, lead vocals
 Slim Jim Phantom – drums, vocals
 Lee Rocker – bass guitar, vocals

Charts

References 

2019 albums
Stray Cats albums